Topcliffe may refer to:
Topcliffe, North Yorkshire
Topcliffe, West Yorkshire
RAF Topcliffe
Richard Topcliffe